"Luck in My Eyes" is a song recorded by Canadian country music artist k.d. lang. It was released in 1990 as the fourth single from her fourth studio album, Absolute Torch and Twang. It peaked at number 10 on the RPM Country Tracks chart in April 1990. The song was nominated for a Grammy Award for Best Country Song at the 32nd Annual Grammy Awards.

Chart performance

References

1989 songs
1990 singles
K.d. lang songs
Sire Records singles
Songs written by Ben Mink
Songs written by k.d. lang